António Maria de Mello Breyner Félix da Costa  (born 31 August 1991) is a Portuguese professional racing driver for the Porsche Formula E Team and the 2019–20 Formula E Drivers' Champion.

He won the Macau Grand Prix invitational Formula Three race in 2012 and 2016, as well as the Formula Renault 2.0 Northern European Cup in 2009. He is the younger half-brother of Duarte Félix da Costa, also a racing driver, who primarily competes in sportscar racing.

After progressing through various levels of the junior formulae motorsport ladder, Félix da Costa's breakthrough year came during the 2012 season. Having started the season driving for the Carlin team in the GP3 Series, Félix da Costa was selected to join the Red Bull Junior Team, replacing Formula Renault 3.5 Series driver Lewis Williamson, who had failed to score a point in the first three meetings of the season. Félix da Costa assumed Williamson's drive with the Arden Caterham team, where he ultimately won four of the final five races to be held in the campaign en route to fourth position in the final championship standings, just 23 points behind eventual champion Robin Frijns. Félix da Costa moved to the Arden Caterham team full-time for the 2013 season.

Both Félix da Costa and Frijns received tests with the Red Bull Racing Formula One team for the Young Drivers' test in Abu Dhabi – Félix da Costa's second such appearance at the tests, after driving for Force India in  – with Félix da Costa setting the pace on the second day. He completed the season with the first Portuguese victory in the Macau Grand Prix in 58 years, leading every racing lap of the meeting en route to victory.

Early career

Karting
Born in Cascais, Félix da Costa began his karting career at the age of nine. In the Cadet class, Félix da Costa won the Portuguese Championship and the Portuguese Karting Open in 2002, before winning the South Portuguese Championship in 2003. In 2004, Félix da Costa stepped up to the ICA-J class, but he had to wait until 2006 to win his first title, the Portuguese Championship. 2006 was the year where he also achieved strong results in European karting events, with a runner-up placing in the World Series Karting Championship and a third in the Italian Open Masters. In 2007, Félix da Costa became an official factory driver for the legendary Italian Tony Kart team, in the newly renamed KF2 category alongside Will Stevens. His best results were a fourth in the Asia-Pacific Championship and a runner-up in the South-Garda Winter Cup.

Formula Renault 2.0

2008
Félix da Costa moved into single seaters in 2008, competing in both the Eurocup and Northern European championships of Formula Renault. Making his debut in the NEC at Hockenheim, he finished third behind team-mates Valtteri Bottas and Tobias Hegewald, after starting from third on the grid. Unlike his team-mates, his primary focus was the NEC rather than the Eurocup, and Félix da Costa achieved his first NEC win at Oschersleben, while most of his rivals were competing in the Eurocup round at the Hungaroring. He finished the season as runner-up in the championship, 86 points behind Bottas –who won twelve of the season's sixteen races – and as a prize, Félix da Costa tested a Formula Renault 3.5 Series car with the P1 Motorsport team at Paul Ricard. During the season, Félix da Costa also contested six Eurocup races; he recorded a best finish of fourth at Estoril en route to thirteenth in the championship, with five points-scoring finishes in total. Félix da Costa also served as a rookie driver for A1 Team Portugal, at the New Zealand and South African rounds of the 2008–09 A1 Grand Prix season.

2009
With Bottas, Hegewald, Daniel Ricciardo, Roberto Merhi amongst others moving to either Formula Two or Formula Three, Félix da Costa became a title contender in both the Eurocup and NEC Formula Renault series. Félix da Costa followed Bottas' lead of 2008, by dominating the NEC field, wrapping up the title at the Nürburgring. Consistency was the key to Félix da Costa's Eurocup campaign, finishing in the top five in the first seven races. He led the series until the rounds at the Nürburgring, where he ran under appeal, for a technical infringement in Super Pole. Félix da Costa dominated the first race at the brand new Ciudad del Motor de Aragón circuit, winning from his first series pole position, and also set fastest lap along the way. He completed the double the following day, however he lost out on second place in the championship to Jean-Éric Vergne on a tie-breaker.

Formula Three

2010

Félix da Costa stepped up to the Formula 3 Euro Series for the 2010 season, moving up with Motopark Academy. Félix da Costa scored a point on his début at Le Castellet, giving him pole position for the second race via the series' reverse-grid system. He took further points-scoring finishes in the Saturday races at Hockenheim, Valencia, the Norisring and the Nürburgring. The following day at the Nürburgring, Félix da Costa became the first Portuguese driver to win a race in the series, after he passed pole-sitter Jim Pla at the start of the race. Félix da Costa followed this victory up with further victories at each of the following two meetings at Zandvoort and Brands Hatch; he had finished the Saturday races in eighth position, and thus started both meetings' Sunday races from pole position and led both from start to finish.

He achieved one further podium finish at Oschersleben, finishing third, en route to a final championship placing of seventh place and was top-placed rookie. He also contested his first Macau Grand Prix at the end of the season, joining Carlin for the event. Having recorded the thirteenth fastest time in qualifying, Félix da Costa progressed up the field to a sixth-place finish in the main 15-lap race. Prior to the event, Félix da Costa took part in the Formula One Young Drivers' Test in Abu Dhabi for Force India. Félix da Costa set the third-fastest time of the first day's running, completing 77 laps.

2011
In order to return to the Macau Grand Prix in 2011, Félix da Costa contested two meetings of the British Formula Three Championship for Hitech Racing, replacing Max Snegirev in one of the team's cars. He contested races at the Nürburgring and Paul Ricard during July, at circuits he had competed at previously in the Formula 3 Euro Series. He achieved a podium finish in the final race at the Nürburgring, finishing second to Felipe Nasr after a last-lap pass on Carlos Huertas, while he accumulated two podium finishes – second in race one and third in race two – at Paul Ricard. He finished the championship in thirteenth place, tied on points with another of the team's drivers, Riki Christodoulou. He rejoined Hitech Racing for Macau, where he started from the front row for the qualifying race – after Roberto Merhi was given a post-qualifying penalty – but stalled on the grid at the race start, dropping to the back of the field before retiring with gearbox issues. He retired from the main race with a wheel issue.

2012
For the 2012 Macau Grand Prix, drivers had to compete in any Formula Three championship race during the calendar year, rather than an FIA-regulated championship meeting like previous years, due to the introduction of Dallara's new F312. As a result, Félix da Costa had to compete, for Carlin, in the MotorSport Vision Formula Three Cup – a second-tier Formula Three series in the United Kingdom – in its season-ending round at Snetterton, due to commitments in other series. Félix da Costa comfortably won both races, winning the first race by almost a minute and the second race by almost forty seconds. At Macau, Félix da Costa set the fastest time during the first qualifying session on Thursday, but ultimately had to start from second on the grid after Alex Lynn improved upon his time during the second session on Friday. Lynn made a slow start in the qualification race and Félix da Costa was momentarily passed by Felix Rosenqvist before he moved back ahead under braking for Lisboa on lap one. He maintained the lead until the end, taking pole position for the main race. Rosenqvist repeated his qualification race start in the Grand Prix itself, but Félix da Costa retook the lead at Lisboa on lap one once again. Félix da Costa maintained the lead until the end, to become the first Portuguese winner of the Grand Prix since Eduardo de Carvalho won the inaugural event in 1954. It was also Carlin's first win in the race since 2001, when Takuma Sato won the event.

GP3 Series

2010
Alongside his Formula Three commitments for Motopark Academy, Félix da Costa made his GP3 Series début during the series' inaugural season in 2010, replacing Lucas Foresti at the Carlin team for the rounds at the Hungaroring and Spa-Francorchamps. This was due to Foresti racing concurrently in the British Formula Three Championship, and the GP3 meetings clashed with Formula Three races at Spa-Francorchamps and Snetterton. In his first race, Félix da Costa finished in sixth place, but that was to be his only points-scoring finish, and eventually finished the season 26th in the drivers' championship standings.

2011
For 2011, Félix da Costa moved into the series on a full-time basis, signing for the Status Grand Prix team to partner former Formula Three rival Alexander Sims and Ivan Lukashevich. Félix da Costa scored points in both races at the season-opening event at Istanbul Park, where he recorded finishes of fifth place and fourth place respectively. After these finishes, Félix da Costa went on a run of nine races without a points finish, with ninth place at Silverstone being his best finish of the barren spell. This was ended by a sixth-place finish at the Hungaroring, scoring a point having started from eleventh on the grid. He failed to score at Spa-Francorchamps, before a seventh-place finish in the opening race at Monza, where he made his way up the order from fourteenth on the grid. Starting alongside Mitch Evans on the front row for the final race of the season, Félix da Costa held a top-three placing for most of the race and when Evans and James Calado collided with three laps remaining, Félix da Costa was to profit as he assumed the race lead. He held the lead until the end of the race, holding off Rio Haryanto by 0.7 seconds to take his first GP3 victory; the victory helped him to finish thirteenth in the final drivers' championship standings. Félix da Costa also contested the non-championship GP2 Final in Abu Dhabi for Ocean Racing Technology, taking finishes of seventh and thirteenth places respectively.

2012
Félix da Costa remained in the series for 2012, and he rejoined the Carlin team, partnering British drivers Alex Brundle and William Buller. For the opening round of the season in Barcelona, Félix da Costa qualified on pole position by 0.01 seconds ahead of Lotus GP team-mates Conor Daly and Aaro Vainio. Félix da Costa jumped the start of the race, and was given a drive-through penalty as a result. He ultimately finished the race in fourteenth place, before taking a seventh-place finish in the weekend's other race. He finished seventh in the opening race at Monaco, meaning he started second for the second race of the weekend. He remained in that position during the race, following Marlon Stöckinger across the line for his first podium of the season.

Félix da Costa was excluded from qualifying at Valencia for a technical infringement, forcing him to start the first race from the back of the grid. He retired from the race on the second lap, after an incident with Dmitry Suranovich; he was later found guilty of causing an avoidable collision and was given a ten-place grid penalty for the second race, forcing him to start at the back once again. Over the course of the 14-lap race, Félix da Costa moved up from 24th to 8th, setting fastest lap of the race in the process. He qualified third at Silverstone, but in the wet conditions that race one was held in, Félix da Costa managed to overtake Vainio off the line, and Mitch Evans early on the first lap. He held the lead from the remainder of the race to take his first win of the season. He finished sixth in the weekend's second race, enabling him to move into third place in the drivers' championship.

After a double retirement at Hockenheim, Félix da Costa scored his second victory of the season at the Hungaroring. Qualifying second to Vainio, Félix da Costa managed to hold off the advances of Evans at the start of the race, and eventually pulled away from his rivals. Evans was later passed by Lotus GP's Daniel Abt, but Félix da Costa maintained a four-second lead over them both and remained clear to the end. With the reverse-grid system, Félix da Costa started eighth for the second race, held in drying conditions. He had moved up to fifth place, on wet tyres, before making a pit stop for dry tyres. At one point during the race, Félix da Costa was lapping some ten seconds quicker than race leaders Matias Laine and Vainio, quickly making his way through the order. He moved into the lead with three laps to go, and ultimately won the race – becoming the first GP3 driver to win both races during a race weekend – by almost twelve seconds from Patric Niederhauser. At Spa-Francorchamps, Félix da Costa finished both races in second position to move himself into championship contention, 21.5 points behind championship leader Evans. However, the opening race at Monza eliminated him from the running after a strange electronic problem in the car forcing him to stop during the race, the car suddenly gained power again and he managed to finish the race in 15th, and he ultimately fell to third in the final drivers' championship standings thanks to a win and second for Abt at the meeting.

Formula Renault 3.5

2012
Midway through the 2012 season, Félix da Costa was selected to join the Red Bull Junior Team, replacing Formula Renault 3.5 Series driver Lewis Williamson, who had failed to score a point in the first three meetings of the season. Félix da Costa was selected to replace Williamson at the Arden Caterham squad – joining Alexander Rossi at the team – ahead of the fourth round of the season, at the Nürburgring. In his début race, Félix da Costa achieved a ninth-place finish, scoring two points towards the championship. At Moscow Raceway, Félix da Costa was able to qualify in seventh position for the series' first-ever race at the track, out-qualifying Rossi by almost three tenths of a second. He passed Nico Müller at the start of the race, and was able to hold sixth place for the first half of the race before being demoted by Kevin Korjus. Félix da Costa held seventh until the end of the race; he finished fifteenth in the weekend's second race.

At Silverstone, Félix da Costa improved upon his best finish in the series, taking a fifth-place finish in an attritional opening race of the weekend, in which only eleven of the race's twenty-six starters were classified. He also recorded the fastest lap of the race, as he avoided all the incidents that befell other drivers. Félix da Costa achieved his first podium finish the following day, turning a ninth place grid start into a second-place finish. He finished fourth in the opening race at the Hungaroring, before taking a final-lap victory – his first in the series – during the second race, after an engine failure had eliminated race leader Kevin Magnussen. Félix da Costa continued his good form into the following meeting at Le Castellet, winning a rain-affected opening race from as low as sixth position during the race. Félix da Costa qualified seventh for the second race of the weekend, which was run in similar conditions to the first. He had taken the lead by lap six, having passed Jules Bianchi for the position; Bianchi later overturned the advantage in the mandatory pit-stop phase, and ultimately held on to win from Félix da Costa.

Félix da Costa closed the season with a double victory in Catalunya; he won the first race after passing championship contender Sam Bird eight laps from the end, while the final race of the season was another standout wet-weather performance from Félix da Costa, taking victory by almost 28 seconds. Despite missing the first five races of the season, Félix da Costa finished the season fourth in the drivers' championship with 166 points, missing out on the championship title, won by Robin Frijns, by 23 points. Following his performances in both GP3 and Formula Renault 3.5, Félix da Costa was invited to test with the Red Bull Racing Formula One team during the Young Drivers' Test in Abu Dhabi. He tested for two of the scheduled three days, finishing with the second-fastest time – to Magnussen, driving for McLaren – on the opening day, before topping the time-sheets on day two, recording a time half a second quicker than the next best driver, Oliver Turvey.

2013
In an interview with Portuguese newspaper Diário de Notícias in September 2012, Félix da Costa stated that he was seeking a full-time seat in the Formula Renault 3.5 Series for the 2013 season. On 9 January 2013, it was announced that Félix da Costa would be remaining with the Arden Caterham team that he had competed in the series with, during the 2012 season. Félix da Costa, along with Kevin Magnussen, was tipped by the 2012 champion Robin Frijns to be one of the main championship challengers for the season.

DTM

2014 

Félix da Costa competed in the 2014 Deutsche Tourenwagen Masters season for the BMW MTEK team alongside Timo Glock. He scored points on two occasions finishing the season in 21st place with a total of six points. He was retained for the 2015 season.

2015 
In 2015, Félix da Costa moved to BMW Team Schnitzer driving alongside Martin Tomczyk. He did not score any points until race seven at Zandvoort where he got his first podium, finishing in second position. He won the second race of the weekend, for his first DTM victory. He was as high as eighth in points, but ultimately finished eleventh at the end of the season.

Formula E

2014–15 season 
da Costa competed in the inaugural Formula E season competing for Team Aguri in rounds that did not clash with his DTM commitments. In the team he raced alongside Katherine Legge and Salvador Durán during his time in the championship. The 2015 Buenos Aires ePrix saw da Costa get his only win of the season after coming up through the field from eighth. Thereafter, he only had one non-points finish which occurred at the 2015 Berlin ePrix where he finished in eleventh position. At the end of the season, da Costa had 51 points and secured 8th position in the standings.

2015–16 season 

For the 2015–16 Formula E season da Costa retained his seat with Team Aguri alongside Nathanaël Berthon, Salvador Durán and Ma Qinghua. Unfortunately, he had several good races taken away from his due to unreliability. For the first 3 races of the season he raced alongside Nathanaël Berthon before the French driver was dropped in favor of season 1 driver Salvador Durán, who himself was replaced by Ma Qinghua just 3 races later in to the season. Due to DTM commitments da Costa was unable to race the 2016 Berlin ePrix and was himself replaced by René Rast for the race, he would return for the double header to end the season in London. da Costa's best finish of the season was 6th place which he achieved 3 times, at Putrajaya, Punta del Este and London(1). During the 2015 Beijing ePrix he was running in the podium positions when the car had a mechanical failure putting him out of the ePrix. At the 2016 Buenos Aires ePrix he was going for a potential back to back win at the track when another car failure, this time a safety cap piece, put him out of the race. Again bad luck would strike the Portuguese driver at the 2016 Long Beach ePrix when he claimed a sensational pole position only to be disqualified due to his right rear tyre pressure being 0.3psi below minimum. At the 2016 London ePrix for race 2 da Costa finished an impressive 4th only to have a penalty for using too much power demote him to 9th, then a second penalty for track limits down to 11th. When the season had finished, Motorsport.com placed him 4th overall in the top 10 drivers of the season due to keeping cool at all times even when faced with so much bad luck.

2016–17 season 
On 3 July 2016, da Costa announced he would be leaving Team Aguri for season 3 but would be staying in Formula E with another outfit. He was subsequently confirmed as racing alongside Robin Frijns at Andretti.

2017–18 season 
da Costa remained with Andretti for the 2017–18 season.

2018–19 season 
da Costa was retained by Andretti for the 2018–19 season alongside Alexander Sims. He took the pole position and won in the 2018 Ad Diriyah ePrix, the first race of the season with BMW after 3 seasons without podiums. In the second round of 2019 Marrakesh ePrix, he was leading the race before his clash with his teammate Sims which caused his retirement of the race.

2019–20 season 
In 2019 da Costa left Andretti and joined 2018-19 Teams' Champion DS Techeetah to race alongside defending champion Jean-Éric Vergne.He scored his first podium finish of the season in Santiago, finishing 2nd behind Maximilian Günther. He finished 2nd behind Mitch Evans in Mexico. da Costa's first win for DS Techeetah was in Marrakesh, which was the third biggest winning margin in Formula E history (11.427 seconds).

Following the hiatus caused by the global COVID-19 pandemic, da Costa put in a string of dominant performances at the Berlin Templehof Circuit, claiming two wins and a podium to seal the Drivers' title, while also securing the Constructors' Championship for DS Techeetah with two races remaining. As a result of his performance in the season, he received the Order of Merit from President Marcelo Rebelo de Sousa.

2020–21 season 
da Costa continued with DS Techeetah alongside Jean-Éric Vergne for the 2020–21 season.

2021–22 season 
da Costa remained with DS Techeetah for the 2021–22 season, once again partnering Jean-Éric Vergne.

2022–23 season 
After three years at DS Techeetah, da Costa switched to Porsche for the 2022–23 season, replacing André Lotterer and partnering Pascal Wehrlein. The year would start out in a disappointing manner, as the opening pair of events yielded but one points finish for the Portuguese driver, whilst teammate Wehrlein had taken the lead of the championship. Da Costa would fight back in Hyderabad, profiting from a chaotic race to take third after Sébastien Buemi was awarded a post-race penalty, with da Costa having started from 13th in his 100th race in the category. Even more success presented itself in Cape Town, where the Porsche driver made a succession of passes on Nick Cassidy and Jean-Éric Vergne at the tight Turn 7, helping himself to his first victory of the season.

Personal life
Outside of racing, da Costa enjoys surfing. He is fluent in five languages: Portuguese, Spanish, French, English, and Italian.

Racing record

Career summary

† As da Costa was a guest driver, he was ineligible for points.

Complete Formula 3 Euro Series results
(key) (Races in bold indicate pole position, races in italics indicate fastest lap)

Complete GP3 Series results
(key) (Races in bold indicate pole position, races in italics indicate fastest lap)

† Driver did not finish, but completed 90% of the race distance.
‡ Half points awarded as less than 75% of race distance was completed.

Complete GP2 Final results
(key) (Races in bold indicate pole position) (Races in italics indicate fastest lap)

Complete Formula Renault 3.5 Series results
(key) (Races in bold indicate pole position, races in italics indicate fastest lap)

Complete Deutsche Tourenwagen Masters results
(key) (Races in bold indicate pole position; races in italics indicate fastest lap)

† Driver did not finish, but completed 90% of the race distance.

Complete Formula E results
(key) (Races in bold indicate pole position; races in italics indicate fastest lap)

Complete Stock Car Brasil results

† As da Costa was a guest driver, he was ineligible for points.

Complete Blancpain GT Series Sprint Cup results

Complete FIA World Endurance Championship results
(key) (Races in bold indicate pole position; races in italics indicate fastest lap)

Complete 24 Hours of Le Mans results

Distinctions

National orders
 Commander of the Order of Merit (3 September 2020)

See also 
 2018–19 Formula E season

References

External links

 
 

1991 births
Living people
Sportspeople from Cascais
Portuguese racing drivers
Formula Renault Eurocup drivers
Formula Renault 2.0 NEC drivers
Portuguese Formula Renault 2.0 drivers
British Formula Renault 2.0 drivers
A1 Grand Prix Rookie drivers
Formula 3 Euro Series drivers
GP3 Series drivers
GP2 Series drivers
British Formula Three Championship drivers
World Series Formula V8 3.5 drivers
Deutsche Tourenwagen Masters drivers
Formula E drivers
Stock Car Brasil drivers
International GT Open drivers
24 Hours of Daytona drivers
24 Hours of Le Mans drivers
FIA World Endurance Championship drivers
Commanders of the Order of Merit (Portugal)
CRS Racing drivers
Motopark Academy drivers
Carlin racing drivers
Status Grand Prix drivers
Hitech Grand Prix drivers
Ocean Racing Technology drivers
Arden International drivers
BMW M drivers
Team Aguri drivers
Schnitzer Motorsport drivers
Andretti Autosport drivers
Teo Martín Motorsport drivers
Rowe Racing drivers
Techeetah drivers
Jota Sport drivers
Formula E Champions
A1 Grand Prix drivers
ADAC GT Masters drivers
Porsche Formula E Team drivers
Porsche Motorsports drivers
Nürburgring 24 Hours drivers